Inge Posch-Gruska (born 16 May 1962) is an Austrian politician of the Social Democratic Party. She has been Mayor of Hirm since 2007 and was a member of the Landtag of Burgenland from 2005 to 2010. She has been serving as a member of the Federal Council since 2010 and since July 2018 as its President.

References 

1962 births
Living people
Presidents of the Austrian Federal Council
Members of the Federal Council (Austria)
Social Democratic Party of Austria politicians
21st-century Austrian politicians
21st-century Austrian women politicians
People from Baden bei Wien